KTPS may refer to:

 KTPS (FM), a radio station in Pagosa Springs, Colorado
 Kothagudem Thermal Power Station, a power plant located in Telangana, India